A houseboat is a boat that has been designed or modified to be used primarily as a home. Most houseboats are not motorized as they are usually moored or kept stationary at a fixed point, and often tethered to land to provide utilities. However, many are capable of operation under their own power. Float house is a Canadian and American term for a house on a float (raft); a rough house may be called a shanty boat. In Western countries, houseboats tend to be either owned privately or rented out to holiday-goers, and on some canals in Europe, people dwell in houseboats all year round. Examples of this include, but are not limited to, Amsterdam, London, and Paris.

Africa

South Africa
There are a few houseboat options in South Africa, including self-drive houseboats on the Knysna Lagoon and fully catered luxury houseboats on Lake Jozini. There have been a number of serious incidents with houseboat fires in the country. On 19 November 2016, four people died on Hartbeespoort Dam after a fire broke on a party houseboat. On 9 October 2021, a faulty engine set luxury houseboat Shayamanzi alight and led to the death of two crew members and one German tourist.

Zimbabwe
In Zimbabwe, specifically on Lake Kariba, houseboats have been in use since the creation of the lake in the late 1950s/early 1960s.

Asia

Hong Kong
There is a houseboat and fishing community on the southern side of Hong Kong Island known as Aberdeen floating village. There was also one such community in the Yau Ma Tei Typhoon Shelter.

India
In India, houseboats used as accommodation for tourists are common on the backwaters of Kerala, see below, and also on the Dal Lake near Srinagar in Jammu and Kashmir.

Kerala houseboats

Houseboats in Kerala, south India, are huge, slow-moving barges used for leisure trips. They are a reworked model of Kettuvallams (in the Malayalam language, Kettu means "tied with ropes", and vallam means "boat"), which, in earlier times, were used to carry rice and spices from Kuttanad to the Kochi port.  Kerala houseboats were considered a convenient means of transportation. First Modern House Boat In Kerala developed by Thomas Vargheese in Kottayam in the time of Dr Babu Paul IAS.

The popularity of Kettuvallams has returned to function as major tourist attractions.

The hull is made of wooden planks that are held together by ropes of coconut fiber; the usual wood is 'Aanjili'. The roof is made of bamboo poles and palm leaves. The exterior of the boat is painted with protective coats of cashew nut oil.

Kashmir houseboats

Unlike their counterparts in Kerala, the houseboats in Srinagar, Jammu and Kashmir are usually stationary. They are usually moored at the edges of the Dal Lake and Nageen Lake. Some houseboats there were built in the early 1900s, and are still being rented out to tourists. These houseboats are made of wood and usually have intricately carved wood paneling. The houseboats are of different sizes, some having up to three bedrooms apart from a living room and kitchen.

Laos
In Laos, houseboats are used to accommodate tourists on the Mekong river. The houseboats are usually referred to as 'slow boats' and exist in wooden or steel variants.

Europe

Germany

The Port of Hamburg has a sizable water borne community that includes a Flussschifferkirche, or Boatman's Church. Berlin also has some houseboat neighborhoods, notably on the Landwehrkanal in Friedrichshain-Kreuzberg.

Netherlands

In Europe, some of the finest and costliest examples of houseboats can be seen along the canals of Amsterdam, which even have houseboat hotels. Houseboats are very expensive in Amsterdam because of the limited number of moorings; this expense has reduced the likelihood that the approximately 2,400 families that live on the inner waters of Amsterdam will find themselves confronted by new neighbor boats.  The Bloemenmarkt is a houseboat-borne flower market along the Singel in Amsterdam. The town of Maasbommel is pioneering floating houses, with flexible connections for fluids and electricity; these are not primarily intended for travel, but rather to be safe against flooding.

Poland 
Poland is the second largest producer of motor yachts up to 9 meters in length in the world, after the United States. Poland has extensive experience in the production of modern and stylish houseboat yachts and floating houses. Houseboats recreation is practicing on Masuria District and the Vistula and on lakes close to Baltic seaside.

According to Zegluj.pl, the largest houseboat rental service in Poland, there are about 100 new units for charter every year.

Serbia

Houseboats are popular for recreation, dining and clubbing in Serbia. They can be seen in large numbers in Belgrade on the banks of the Danube and Sava rivers, and on river islands. One of them is houseboat on Ada Ciganlija.

United Kingdom

In the United Kingdom, houseboats come under various authorities depending on where they are moored. Those that usually do not move from year to year and are in marinas come under local authorities. Those moored on tidal waters (estuaries and coastal harbours) come under various authorities. Most navigable inland waterways in England and Wales come under the authority of either the waterways managed by Environment Agency (EA, sponsored by Department for Environment, Food and Rural Affairs) or the waterways managed by the Canal and River Trust (CRT). Scotland, Northern Ireland and some additional waterways in England and Wales have their own authorities (see List of navigation authorities in the United Kingdom).

Both the EA and the CRT distinguish between powered vessels (including sail) and unpowered houseboats. The EA defines Launches as "any mechanically propelled vessel not being used solely as a tug or for the carriage of goods", and houseboats that "includes any pleasure boat which is not a launch and which is decked or otherwise structurally covered in and which is or is capable of being used as a place of habitation". The CRT, which manages 2000 miles of inland waterways, requires any houseboat moored on their waterways to have a "Houseboat Certificate". The CRT define houseboats as "A houseboat is defined as 'a boat whose main use is for a purpose other than navigation and which, if needed for the purpose, has planning permission, for the site where it is moored'. A houseboat may be used for navigation from time to time provided it does not become its main use".

The CRT definition provides a very large grey area over what is a houseboat, because an owner of a narrowboat, or other inhabitable vessels (see list of the types of canal craft in the United Kingdom), who live on board, may choose to define their boat either as a cruising vessel (and pay for a cruising licence), or obtain a house boat certificate. It will often depend on which is cheapest, and whether the CRT, or the local authority overseeing a marina's planning permission, allow moorings to be residential (the facilities need meet the requirement of the local authority that allow someone to live permanently aboard at the mooring), or leisure (where the boat can only be inhabited for short periods).

The various moorings stretch from Broadness Creek and Benfleet Creek in the lower part of the London Port Health Authority District up to Twickenham in the upper part. Many of these are Port of London Authority (PLA) licensed moorings which also have Riparian Local Authority planning approval for their existence, whilst others have neither.

North America

Canada
Toronto's Bluffer's Park is home to a small float home community with 24 properties within the park's marina. A city bylaw states that no more than 25 floating homes can be built. The homes in Toronto are built on concrete barges chained to the lake bottom and docked at the marina to allow residence year round. These homes have no motor and thus are not vessels.

Ladner's Canoe Pass Village is a small float home community along the Fraser River near Westham Island, located along River Road in West Ladner, in the Port Guichon neighborhood.  It was opened in 1985 as Canada's first legalized floating home community.

United States

Seattle is home to a relatively large collection of houseboats (capable of moving under their own power) or "floating homes" (houses built on floats) in several neighborhoods, particularly in Lake Union and Portage Bay. These began to appear soon after the time of first European settlement. At their peak in the first half of the 20th century, there were over 2,500 such homes in the city, not even counting seaworthy live-aboard boats. From the first, they included floating slums of shabby shacks, but gentrified houseboats go back at least to 1888 when the Yesler Way cable car reached Leschi on Lake Washington and a string of luxury summer getaways (none of them surviving today) lined the shore from there north to Madison Park. , there were about 480 floating homes on Lake Union and a lesser number elsewhere in the city. Most houseboats are designed and built for inland lakes and waterways only. Portland, Oregon also has many houseboats along both the Willamette River and the Columbia River, with the neighborhood of Hayden Island as a prominent example. Float houses are mostly used on the Pacific coast.

Renting houseboats has also become popular. In addition, houseboats have been used for commerce; on the Northern Neck of Virginia, Chesapeake National Bank had a floating bank branch called the Boat 'n Bank that provided bank services to watermen. Halibut Cove, Alaska has one of the only floating post offices in the US. Mystic Island, New Jersey had a 'botel' (hotel for boaters with water access) when it started in the 1960s but the building has since changed ownership and no longer operates as such.

Sausalito, California, also has one of the most noted collections of float homes that were owned at various times by the likes of famous musicians, film stars, authors, and other notables, from the hippie era until even today. Nearby Belvedere's houseboats date to the late 1800s, and houseboats in the area were homes to railway men shipping logs to San Francisco via the ferry at Sausalito. Like many areas where float homes have taken hold, battles have brewed between float home owners, local and state government, and the local establishment (which includes land-based home owners). Float home owners had fought established land-based tax schemes whereby float home owners sought relief from real estate taxes. The state won the battle with the shadow tax allowing the state to make the case that property beneath the float home was improved by the shadow the float home cast upon the bottom.

For recreation

Houseboating is a very popular recreational activity for groups of people of all ages, aboard houseboats of all varieties, ranging from more modest 30–40-foot boats to -plus luxury houseboat models.   Alternatives to the traditional houseboats include flybridge cruisers and catamarans also providing overnight accommodation up to a week. 

Houseboating is appealing due to the ability to more completely explore the local scenery, remain in close proximity to other outdoor activities (hiking, boating, beaches, etc.), and finally, retain the potential to move the living quarters for a change of view or neighbors, on a whim.

Recreational houseboating in the United States started in the late 1940s when people were looking to stay on the water for longer periods of time. Lake Cumberland in Kentucky is considered the birthplace of houseboating in the USA. 80% of America's manufactured houseboats are in the counties surrounding Lake Cumberland. Kentucky has more lake-style houseboats than any other place in the world. Monticello, Kentucky is known as the "Houseboat Capital of the World."

Houseboating lakes
Houseboating on Lake Powell is a popular vacation option since the Glen Canyon Dam impounds water from the Colorado River to form almost  of shoreline. Lake Mead, the largest man-made lake in North America, about 30 minutes from Las Vegas, New Bullards Bar Reservoir in the Sierra Nevada foothills about 45 minutes from Nevada City, California, and Lake Shasta in the mountains just outside Redding, California, are also popular spots for houseboats.  Four rivers or "arms" merge to create this: the Sacramento, McCloud, Squaw Creek, and Pit. Shasta Dam, the highest center spillway dam in the world, can be found at the southwest corner of the lake. Lake Shasta Caverns, can only be reached from the lake.

Houseboating is also common on Lake Cumberland - often referred to as the Houseboat Manufacturing Capital of the World (as the majority of American-built houseboats are manufactured in the counties surrounding Lake Cumberland). Lake Cumberland and other lakes in the Southeast US such as Norris Lake (TN), Dale Hollow Lake (KY/TN), Center Hill Lake (TN), Lake Lanier (GA) and more offer very favorable houseboating conditions as the geography provides a vast number of coves and fingers that allow houseboats to tie up or anchor away from the main channel and provides the user a peaceful, secluded atmosphere.  Due to the large number of houseboat manufacturers located in the Southeast US, the new and used houseboat marketplace in the Southeast is one of the most competitive and affordable areas for houseboats to be purchased in the nation.  Houseboat transporters can also deliver a houseboat to any body of water in the US.  Houseboating is also popular on Lake Amistad, Trinity Lake, Lake Mohave and Lake Mead National Recreation Area. In New York, houseboats have also become a major part of the great South Bay on Long Island. Houseboats are also available for rental at Lake Billy Chinook in Central Oregon where waterskiing is popular.  Lake Billy Chinook has many little coves to anchor the houseboat.

Shanty boats
Roughly built float houses are sometimes called shanty boats but may be built on a raft or hull. In historic logging operations workmen sometimes used an ark as mobile dwellings.

Oceania

Australia

In Australia, especially on the Murray River (most notably the town of Mannum) and the sunny coastline of Queensland there are many motorized, pontoon-based houseboats with two or more bedrooms; some of these houseboats have more than one level or multiple stories (floors). Some are privately owned as either a primary residence or a holiday shack. Many are also available for hire (rent) as self-driven holiday destinations with accommodation for four to perhaps a dozen persons. Coomera River, the Great Sandy Straits (near the world's largest sand island - Fraser Island) and, in recent times, the Tweed River (near Barri Island during the popular Tournament Crabbing competitions) are especially popular with Queenslanders and interstate tourists. Lake Eildon in Victoria.  The Hawkesbury River near Sydney in New South Wales has over 120 kms of river open to houseboats and alternatives.  These include flybridge cruisers and catamarans, which also offer overnight accommodation, yet are more manoeuvrable, easier to drive and have the ability to go further afield than the traditional houseboats and have the feel of true boating.  Houseboats can be limited to locations because they cannot pass under bridges safely due to manoeuvrability.

New Zealand
In New Zealand houseboating is developing as a holiday activity. Whangaroa Harbour on Northland's east coast is a land locked harbour that provides houseboating.

South America

Venezuela
In Maracaibo, Venezuela, there is a big house called La Casa Barco (the Ship House), which was built by a former captain of the Venezuelan Navy in the 20th century. The building resembles a ship with its anchors, lifeboats, and radars, floating on water. It is located in the neighbourhood of La Estrella, and has become a city icon for tourists.

Carbon monoxide from gasoline-powered generators

Many houseboats use gasoline-powered generators. The carbon monoxide (CO) exhaust from these generators has caused problems for some houseboat inhabitants. The US National Institute for Occupational Safety and Health, in tandem with the US National Park Service and the U.S. Coast Guard, performed a number of evaluations on air quality, particularly carbon monoxide levels, on houseboats beginning in August 2000. Since that initial investigation, over 600 boating-related poisonings in the United States have been identified, over 100 of which caused death. Over 250 of the poisonings occurred on houseboats, more than 200 of which were attributed to generator exhaust alone. Some houseboat and generator manufacturers have begun working with these agencies to evaluate engineering controls to reduce CO concentrations in occupied areas on houseboats.

Gallery

See also

 Barracks ship
 Boathouse, a structure which stores boats and boating equipment
 Botel
 Cabin cruiser
 Floating Hospital
 Floating restaurant 
 Hotelship
 Hulk (ship)
 Kettuvallam
 Prison ship
 Seasteading
 Stilt house
 YHB, the US Navy hull classification symbol for a houseboat

References

External links

Houseboat Museum Amsterdam
"The Case of the Hospitable Houseboat." Popular Science, July 1969, pp. 50–55.

Articles containing video clips
Boat types
Boat
 
Tourist accommodations